Pernilla Månsson Colt, (born Eva Elisabet Månsson, 23 December 1966) is a Swedish television presenter, producer, editor, and journalist.

Biography
Månsson Colt was born in Örebro, Örebro County.  At the age of 16, and after three years of studying cultural studies at Risbergska School in Örebro, she began working for the local radio station, P4 Örebro, eventually becoming a permanent job. At 24, she worked at Sveriges Television's (SVT) youth office in Växjö.

Månsson Colt currently works as a producer for SVT's Antikrundan; the Swedish version of the BBC show: Antiques Roadshow. She presents the gardening show, Trädgårdsonsdag along with Tareq Taylor, and writes columns for the newspaper Drömhem & Trädgård.

Månsson Colt is married to musician Stellan Colt, they have two sons, and live in Klagshamn, Skåne County.

Work
1992-1993 - PM
Månsson & media
Korseld
1995 - Melodifestivalen 1995 (Presenter)
1998 - Eurovision Song Contest 1995 (Swedish commentator)
1997 - Centralen
1998 - Melodifestivalen 1998 (Presenter)
1998 - Eurovision Song Contest 1998 (Swedish commentator)
1999-2003 - Bumerang (Presenter)
2000 - Eurovision Song Contest 2000 (Swedish commentator)
2000 - En kväll för världens barn
2000 - Dansk skalle, svensk tiger (Presenter)
2000 - Opening of the Øresund Bridge
Packat & Klart 
Anders och Måns (Guest)
Bästa Formen
Sverige (Editor)
Årets kock
Trädgårdsonsdag
2013 - Eurovision Song Contest 2013
Semi-final allocation draw presenter.
Opening ceremony presenter at the Malmö Opera and Music Theatre.
2014 - Husdrömmar

References

External links

 

1966 births
Swedish television journalists
People from Örebro
Living people
Swedish columnists
Swedish women columnists
Swedish journalists
Swedish women journalists
Swedish women television presenters